The Royal Canadian Army Veterinary Corps (RCAVC) was an administrative corps of the Canadian Army.

The Canadian Army Permanent Veterinary Corps was founded in 1910. The Canadian Army Permanent Veterinary Corps was redesignated the Royal Canadian Army Veterinary Corps on 3 Nov 1919.  The Royal Canadian Army Veterinary Corps was redesignated The Royal Canadian Army Veterinary Corps on 17 Jul 1936. The Royal Canadian Army Veterinary Corps was disbanded on 2 Nov 1940.

The cap badge of the RCAVC was similar to that of Britain's Royal Army Veterinary Corps, but featured a larger figure of Chiron in a wreath of maple leaves surmounted by a Tudor crown, with the letters RCAVC on the ribbon.

History
Until 1910 veterinarians in the Canadian Army were part of the old regimental system. Most veterinarians held a commission in the active militia and left private practice for 10–15 days a year to serve with his regiment. There was only a small number of permanently employed regimental veterinary officers.

In 1910 the Canadian Army Veterinary Service, under the Quartermaster-General of the Canadian Militia, came into existence and had three branches: the Canadian Permanent Army Veterinary Corps (CPAVC), the Canadian Army Veterinary Corps (CAVC) and the Regimental Veterinary Service, which was being phased out. By the outbreak of war in 1914, the Regimental Veterinary Service had ceased to exist, the CPAVC was still incomplete, so the majority of veterinarians and other ranks were found in the CAVC.

The CAVC was organized into seven Sections, though only two, Winnipeg and Montreal, were at a state of readiness at the outbreak of war: London, Ontario; Toronto; Kingston, Ontario; Quebec; Halifax, Nova Scotia; Winnipeg and Calgary. There was also a Senior Veterinary Officer, headquartered in Kingston. Within each Division or District, there was a Principal Veterinary Officer. Provision was also made for a Canadian Army Veterinary School.

In 1919 the CPAVC was reconstituted as the Royal Canadian Army Veterinary Corps. In 1940, the RCAVC was disbanded by the Privy Council and the recommendation of the Treasury Board, in order to save $10,334.

Prominent Members
Captain Harry Colebourn (April 12, 1887 – September 24, 1947), a veterinarian with the Royal Canadian Army Veterinary Corps, is best known for donating a bear cub, named "Winnie" (short for "Winnipeg"), to the London Zoo. He had purchased the young black bear in White River, Ontario, while en route to the Canadian Forces Base (CFB) Valcartier in Quebec.

Related units
This unit was allied with the following:
Royal Army Veterinary Corps

References

External links 

 The Case for Reactivating the Royal Canadian Army Veterinary Corps (RCAVC)
 History of Veterinary Medicine-The Canadian Encyclopedia
 The Royal Canadian Army Veterinary Corps - canadiansoldiers.com
 The Story of the Real ‘Winnie the Bear’ - History to the People
 Lt. Harry Colebourn And Winnie-the-Bear - THE FORT GARRY HORSE

Further reading 
 Shushkewich, V. (2005). The Real Winnie: A One-of-a-Kind Bear. Dundurn.
 Stortz, G. J. (1982). A Canadian Veterinarian Overseas in the First World War. The Canadian Veterinary Journal, 23(6), 183–186.

1910 establishments in Canada
1940 disestablishments in Canada
Military units and formations established in 1910
Military units and formations disestablished in 1940
Military veterinary services
Veterinary medicine in Canada
Administrative corps of the Canadian Army
Army units and formations of Canada in World War I